WCJB-TV (channel 20) is a television station in Gainesville, Florida, United States, affiliated with ABC and The CW Plus. Owned by Gray Television, the station maintains studios on Northwest 43rd Street in Gainesville, and its transmitter is located near Micanopy, Florida.

History
WCJB began broadcasting April 7, 1971 as an NBC affiliate owned by William E. "Bill" Minshall. Originally broadcasting an analog signal on UHF channel 20, its call sign bears the first initials of his family members: Casey (daughter), JoAnn (wife), and himself, Bill. In 1973, just two years after its first broadcast, the station switched its affiliation to ABC. In 1976, WCJB was sold to Diversified Communications. In 2001, it began airing its digital signal on UHF channel 16. WCJB was one of the ABC affiliates that did air Saving Private Ryan in 2004, as Cox Media Group-owned Orlando affiliate WFTV preempted the film.

On September 18, 2006, WCJB launched a new second digital subchannel to be the area's The CW affiliate as part of the national CW Plus service, replacing the cable-only WB 100+ affiliate "WBFL" after the WB-UPN merger.

Its coverage area includes Lake City (within the Jacksonville market), Ocala (in the Orlando market) and most of North Central Florida. It is also the sole ABC affiliate on cable systems in Live Oak and Jasper (both within the Tallahassee area). Until July 2006, WCJB was the only ABC affiliate seen on Cox systems in Ocala. Even though that city is part of the Orlando market, this station had exclusivity on that system for ABC programming. This kept in-market affiliate WFTV off the system for several years. In that month, the cable company received the green light to pick up WFTV's standard and high definition feeds in Ocala. WFTV and WCJB are also both seen on Charter Spectrum in Belleview and unincorporated Marion County.

Diversified announced on February 16, 2017, that it would exit broadcasting and sell WCJB and its sister station WABI-TV in Bangor, Maine to Gray Television for $85 million. The sale was completed on May 1, 2017. It made WCJB a sister station to WCTV (Gray Television's then-flagship station) in Tallahassee and WJHG-TV and WECP-LD in Panama City.

Programming
Syndicated programming on WCJB-TV (as of September 2022) includes Entertainment Tonight, Dr. Phil, and Inside Edition, among others. The station was among the handful of ABC affiliates to have aired the syndicated Who Wants to Be a Millionaire, which aired first-run on the network in 1999, until the show's cancellation in 2019.

Syndicated programming on WCJB-DT2 includes Divorce Court, Judge Jerry, The Steve Wilkos Show, Maury, and repeats of Black-ish and The Goldbergs that previously first-ran on the main ABC channel.

Sports programming
WCJB airs select Florida Gators football games as part of ABC's rights to college football telecasts. The station aired the Gators' first-ever national championship in 1996 through their victory in the 1997 Sugar Bowl.

News operation
As of September 2022, WCJB presently broadcasts 35 hours, 15 minutes of locally produced newscasts each week (with 6 hours, 35 minutes each weekday and an hour each on Saturdays and Sundays). The station also broadcasts 2½ hours of late local news each week on its WCJB-DT2 CW subchannel.

Originally, WCJB was the only station to operate a news department covering the Gainesville area. As a result, it held the number one spot in Nielsen ratings by a wide margin for most of the station's existence. In addition to its main studios, this station operates a Marion County Bureau on Northeast 1st Avenue in Ocala.

Until the establishment of GTN News in 2010 (now CBS 4 News), WCJB had the only local news department on a commercial station – non-commercial WUFT television airs a nightly newscast produced by University of Florida journalism and broadcasting students; and Fox affiliate WOGX simulcasts newscasts from sister station WOFL in Orlando, with no separate local inserts targeted to the Gainesville area.

On April 19, 2009, WCJB debuted a new set complete with updated graphics and music theme (identical to that of Des Moines CBS affiliate KCCI in the late '90s) which had not changed in almost ten years. The graphics are yellow and orange instead of blue and white. Its updated logo now includes ABC in it unlike the previous two. WCJB began airing local newscasts in high definition on January 9, 2010. Its music theme was later updated in 2012, with a background graphics color change to blue and red. The music theme and news set was then modified on October 22, 2015, and the background graphics was updated on February 1, 2016, showing photos relating to Gainesville and North Central Florida.

From September 18, 2006, until February 2010, it produced a half-hour weeknight prime time newscast on WCJB-DT2, titled WCJB-TV 20 News at 10 on Gainesville CW. The live broadcast was dropped in favor of a repeat of the main channel's 6 o'clock show, but the repeat was later dropped as well.

On January 18, 2016, WCJB expanded its early evening newscast a half-hour earlier to 5:00 p.m. instead of 5:30. The 6:00 p.m. newscast remains as scheduled.

On June 26, 2017, for the first time in over eight years, WCJB updated a new logo.

On September 6, 2021, WCJB added an hour-long weekday 4:00 p.m. newscast on the main channel and relaunched a half-hour 10:00 p.m. newscast on the DT2 CW subchannel.

On September 5, 2022, WCJB extended its weekday noon newscast to one hour, with the last half-hour replacing the canceled Right This Minute.

Florida–Dayton recreation
On March 29, 2014, the Florida Gators beat the Dayton Flyers 62–52 in the Elite Eight of the NCAA basketball tournament. Since WCJB is an ABC affiliate and CBS owned the broadcast rights (although the game aired nationally on TBS), the network could not show highlights until the day after per NCAA regulations. The news team instead recreated the highlights inside a conference room at the station's studios, using a mini-hoop attached to the wall and the station staff doubling as players.

Technical information

Subchannels
The station's digital signal is multiplexed:

WCJB-DT2 upgraded its signal to 720p in June 2012.

In January 2018, WCJB added MeTV to its subchannel lineup on channel 20.3, marking the first new subchannel added to WCJB since adding Gainesville CW  in September 2006. MeTV had been aired on NBC affiliate WNBW's subchannel 9.4 prior to the change.

On January 1, 2020, WCJB launched a new subchannel, Circle, on channel 20.4.

In March 2020, WCJB added another new subchannel, Justice Network (now True Crime Network), on channel 20.5.

On December 1, 2022, the station added a sixth subchannel, Grit.

Analog-to-digital conversion
WCJB-TV discontinued regular programming on its analog signal, over UHF channel 20, on February 17, 2009, the original target date in which full-power television stations in the United States were to transition from analog to digital broadcasts under federal mandate (which was later pushed back to June 12, 2009). The station's digital signal remained on its pre-transition UHF channel 16. Through the use of PSIP, digital television receivers display the station's virtual channel as its former UHF analog channel 20.

Former translator
Until 1998, WCJB operated an analog translator station, W57AN (UHF channel 57) which rebroadcast WCJB's signal into Marion County from a transmitter located on NE Jacksonville Rd in Ocala.

See also
Channel 16 digital TV stations in the United States
Channel 20 virtual TV stations in the United States

References

External links
Official website
Gainesville CW

Gray Television
CJB-TV
ABC network affiliates
MeTV affiliates
Circle (TV network) affiliates
True Crime Network affiliates
Grit (TV network) affiliates
Television channels and stations established in 1971
1971 establishments in Florida